"Spheres" is a classical digital-only single by Mike Oldfield from his album Music of the Spheres released on 3 March 2008.

Demo version 
The track "Spheres" is an early demo from the conception of Music of the Spheres and thus has no input from others, such as Karl Jenkins. It contains parts of the tracks "Harbinger" and "Shabda" from the album. The track is largely recorded using synthesized instruments, which were not used in the final album in favour of a full orchestra.

Charts 
At the week ending 9 March 2008, "Spheres" was #1 on the 7digital Track Chart.

Track listing 
 "Spheres" – 5:22

References 

2008 singles
Mike Oldfield songs
Songs written by Mike Oldfield
Mercury Records singles
2008 songs